Three species of bird were formerly considered subspecies of the bar-winged cinclodes:

 Buff-winged cinclodes, Cinclodes fuscus
 Chestnut-winged cinclodes, Cinclodes albidiventris
 Cream-winged cinclodes, Cinclodes albiventris

Birds by common name